MPFC or mPFC may refer to:

 Medial prefrontal cortex
 Monty Python's Flying Circus